Remember Me is a 2019 romantic comedy film directed by Martin Rosete, and starring Bruce Dern, Caroline Silhol and Brian Cox.  The screenplay, written by Rafa Russo, was included in Franklin Leonard's Black List.

Initiating principal photography from August 24, 2018, in Madrid, Spain, Remember Me marks the second feature film of Martin Rosete and Atit Shah as partners.

The film released internationally May 5, 2020 by Universal Pictures and was released in the United States in July.

Cast
Bruce Dern as Claude
Brian Cox as Shane
Caroline Silhol as Lilian
Brandon Larracuente
Sienna Guillory as Selma

Production
Producer Atit Shah and his company Create Entertainment handled development, packaging, and production of the film in cooperation with Rosete's company Kamel Films based in Madrid, Spain.

Casting
On August 7, 2018, Variety announced that Bruce Dern, Brian Cox and Caroline Silhol had joined the cast.

Soon after The Hollywood Reporter announced had Sienna Guillory and Brandon Larracuente had joined the cast.

Filming
Principal photography began in Madrid, Spain, on August 24, 2017 over a period of 30 days.

References

External links
 
 

English-language French films
English-language Spanish films
American romantic comedy films
French romantic comedy films
Spanish romantic comedy films
2019 romantic comedy films
2019 films
American independent films
Films set in the United States
Films shot in Spain
Films shot in France
Films shot in the United States
2010s English-language films
2010s American films
2010s French films